Matthew Landy Steen (born August 22, 1949), also known under the alias William Hollis Coquillette  is a former member of Weather Underground Organization and Students for a Democratic Society. In 1972 he was indicted on federal conspiracy and bank robbery charges to finance radical leftist Weatherman activities, sentenced to a ten-year federal prison term.

In June, 1972 Steen attempted to be an informant for the FBI about the February, 1970 San Francisco Park Station Bombing.

Steen was featured on the lead segment of 60 Minutes, "Fake ID", in an interview with Mike Wallace, first aired February 1, 1976. This was the first time a former Weatherman had ever appeared on national television. He was queried about false identities and traveler's check fraud.

1976 60 Minutes interview

Interviewed in Beverly Hills in mid-1975 by Mike Wallace, Steen responded to questions about identity theft (he possessed ID of at least 150 people) and how he purchased and reported stolen some $50,000 to $100,000 in traveler's checks, while still being able to cash the originals. This was the first time a former Weatherman had appeared on the CBS news show. It was re-broadcast several months later.

The entire interview can be viewed, beginning at the 48 minute 19 second mark, in this November 2015 speech about making documentaries.

Transcript of Steen's portion of the segment:
[From the Congressional Record. May 24, 1977]

"60 MINUTES" MAY 16, 1977—"FALSE ID"

(Note: the episode first aired February 1, 1976 and re-aired on May 16, 1976.  It never aired in 1977 and the actual title is "Fake ID")

. . .
MIKE WALLACE: Walking proof that the process really does work is this young man, Matthew
Steen, alias Eric Gilbert Dietz, alias T. Swingle Frick, III, alias Romez Tormey. In
1970, while a student at Berkeley, Steen went underground as a member of the militant
Weathermen organization. Before he was arrested in 1971, Steen says he had
obtained a hundred-fifty different identities—almost all of them courtesy of various
Government agencies.

What kind of documents are we talking about?

MATTHEW STEEN: Birth certificates, notarized birth certificates, driver's licenses
from various states, occasionally Social Security cards, and other superficial types of
identification, like library cards, et cetera.

WALLACE: And you had no real difficulty in doing this?

STEEN: No.

WALLACE: By the time the FBI got to him in 1971, Steen acknowledges he had
used various fake ID's to rip off the Bank of America. He'd buy a set of Travellers'
Checks; then, a couple of weeks later, claim they'd been lost or stolen—and get replacements.
He had doubled his money.

How much did you make this way?

STEEN: Somewhere between fifty and a hundred thousand dollars.

WALLACE: Among the official documents Matt Steen obtained under assumed
names was a U.S. passport. Well, for decades, the head of the passport office in
Washington has been keenly aware of the fake ID problem—Frances Knight.

Ms. FRANCES KNIGHT: This has been going on for years. Identify fraud is nothing
that—that is new in this Administration or in this decade. And yet, nobody—including
the—the brains of the Department of Justice—have been able to come up with
anything to stop it. It's been increasing.
. . .

Federal prison 

Steen was sentenced to two consecutive five-year terms, served three years and released from United States Penitentiary, Lompoc in 1974 in Santa Barbara.  Shortly after, he campaigned for public office and was twice elected to the Isla Vista Municipal Advisory Council.

Public service 

Steen became the director of a Community Action Agency for Santa Barbara County and was elected to the board of trustees of the local Community College District in Santa Barbara.
  
After his return to San Francisco, Steen was nominated to serve a term on the Market-Octavia Citizen's advisory committee, repurposing public lands that became available after removal of the Central Freeway, damaged in the 1989 Loma Prieta earthquake. He has since served on the San Francisco Shelter Monitoring Committee from 2012 to 2016, ending his two terms as Vice-Chairman, and is a former Vice-Chairman of the San Francisco Public Utilities Commission Citizen Advisory Committee.  Steen, with his late partner Karen Jessica Evans, worked on development of open space, preservation of the urban forest canopy in San Francisco and saving the historic, world-famous Palace of Fine Arts from privatization to maintain unfettered public access in perpetuity.

See also
List of Weatherman members
Youth International Party
Weather Underground

References

1949 births
Activists from the San Francisco Bay Area
COINTELPRO targets
Living people
People from Berkeley, California
People from Santa Barbara, California
People from San Francisco
Members of the Weather Underground
American anti–Vietnam War activists
Political history of the United States